Suzanne M. Bianchi (April 15, 1952, Fort Dodge, Iowa –  November 4, 2013, Santa Monica, California) was an American sociologist. She was known for her work studying the evolving American family and gender roles.

Personal life
Suzanne M. Bianchi was born in Fort Dodge, Iowa to Rita and Pesho Bianchi. Her mother was a housewife and her father was a meat packing plant employee. Bianchi was the oldest of six children. She and her husband, Mark Browning, had three children.

Education and career
After graduating valedictorian from her high school, Bianchi was the first in her family to go to college and earned her B.A. in Sociology from Creighton University, her M.A. from University of Notre Dame, and her Ph.D. from the University of Michigan, Ann Arbor.

Bianchi began her career as a demographer for the U.S. Census Bureau, where she remained until 1994, rising to an assistant division chief position. In 1994, she joined the faculty at the University of Maryland, where she eventually chaired the university's sociology department and became the founding director of the Maryland Population Research Center. In 2000, she served as president of the Population Association of America.

In 2009, Bianchi moved to UCLA, where she was the first Dorothy L. Meier Chair in Social Equities. Among her main fields of study she focused on working mothers, researching and analyzing changes in American family life during the last decades.

Death
In July, 2013, Bianchi was diagnosed with pancreatic cancer. She died on November 4, 2013.

Major contributions
Bianchi made many major contributions with her use of "time diaries." Her work encouraged the creation and use of the American Time Use Survey (ATUS) as well other international time use surveys.

Bianchi's academic work explored the shrinking gender gap and how women's careers affected households. Most of her studies focused on how parents, especially mothers, balance the demands of work and family. She researched women's employment, how husbands and wives divide housework and time with children, and how women take care of their children and parents.

Bianchi notably reported in her 2000 presidential address to the Population Association of America that 1990's working mothers spend similar amounts of time with their children as their 1960's stay-at-home counterparts, disproving the concept that maternal employment harms children.

She was also the co-author of seven books. One of her co-authors, Judith Selzer, said of her, "She always identified puzzles in the social world and tried to solve them by rigorous empirical studies." The book "Continuity and change in the American Family", co-written with Lynne Casper, was award-winning, as well as her book "Changing Rhythms of American Family Life" with Melissa Milkie and John P. Robinson.

References

Sources

1952 births
2013 deaths
People from Fort Dodge, Iowa
Creighton University alumni
University of Notre Dame alumni
University of Michigan alumni
American sociologists
American women sociologists
Family sociologists
American demographers
United States Census Bureau people
University of Maryland, College Park faculty
University of California, Los Angeles faculty
Deaths from pancreatic cancer
Deaths from cancer in California